The Turabay dynasty was the preeminent household of the Bedouin Banu Haritha tribe in northern Palestine whose chiefs traditionally served as the multazims (tax farmers) and sanjak-beys (district governors) of Lajjun Sanjak during Ottoman rule in the 16th–17th centuries. The sanjak spanned the towns of Lajjun, Jenin, Haifa and Atlit and the surrounding countryside. The progenitors of the family had served as chiefs of Marj Bani Amir (the Plain of Esdraelon or Jezreel Valley) under the Mamluks in the late 15th century.

During the Ottoman conquest in 1516–1517, the Turabay chief Qaraja and his son Turabay aided the forces of Ottoman sultan Selim I. The Ottomans kept them in their Mamluk-era role as guardians of the strategic Via Maris and Damascus–Jerusalem highways and rewarded them with tax farms in northern Palestine. Their territory became a sanjak in 1559 and Turabay's son Ali became its first governor. His brother Assaf was appointed in 1573, serving for ten years before being dismissed and exiled to Rhodes for involvement in a rebellion. His nephew Turabay was appointed in 1589 and remained in office until his death in 1601. His son and successor Ahmad, the most prominent chief of the dynasty, ruled Lajjun for nearly a half-century and repulsed attempts by the powerful Druze chief and Ottoman governor of Sidon-Beirut and Safad, Fakhr al-Din Ma'n, to take over Lajjun and Nablus in the 1620s. In the effort, he consolidated the family's alliance with the Ridwan and Farrukh governing dynasties of Gaza and Nablus, which remained intact until the dynasties' demise toward the end of the century.

As multazims and sanjak-beys the Turabays were entrusted with collecting taxes for the Ottomans, quelling local rebellions, acting as judges, and securing roads. They were largely successful in these duties, while keeping good relations with the peasantry and the village chiefs of the sanjak. Although in the 17th century a number of their chiefs lived in the towns of Lajjun and Jenin, the Turabays largely preserved their nomadic way of life, pitching camp with their tribesmen near Caesarea in the winters and the plain of Acre in the summers. The eastward migration of the Banu Haritha to the Jordan Valley, Ottoman centralization drives, and diminishing tax revenues brought about their political decline and they were permanently stripped of office in 1677. The family remained in the area, with members living in Jenin at the close of the century and in Tulkarm.

History

Origins

The Turabays were a family of the Banu Haritha tribe, a branch of the Sinbis, itself a branch of the Bedouin tribe of Tayy. The Damascene historian al-Burini (d. 1615) noted that the Turabays were the preeminent house of the Banu Haritha. During Mamluk rule in Palestine (1260s–1516) the eponymous progenitor of the family, Turabay, was recognized as the chief of Marj Bani Amir. Marj Bani Amir was an amal (subdistrict) of Mamlakat Safad (the province of Safed). Turabay was executed in 1480 and replaced by his son Qaraja.

Early relations with the Ottomans
Qaraja's son Turabay joined the Ottoman sultan Selim I during the latter's conquest of Mamluk Syria and participated in the subsequent conquest of Mamluk Egypt. On 8 February 1517, after his victory over the Mamluks, Selim wrote to Qaraja from Cairo, ordering him to capture Mamluk officials fleeing Egypt, transfer captive commanders to the sultan, and execute regular soldiers. On 2 February 1518, Qaraja paid homage to Selim in Damascus, where the sultan had stopped on his return to the imperial capital Constantinople. The Damascene historian Ibn Tulun (d. 1546) referred to Qaraja as amir al-darbayn (commander of the two roads) in reference to his role as the protector of the Via Maris and the road connecting Lajjun to Jerusalem via Jenin and Nablus. In the Ottoman provincial system the part of Marj Bani Amir around the Daughters of Jacob Bridge remained under Safed's direct administration in the newly-formed Safed Sanjak of Damascus Eyalet, while much of the original amal, along with the coastal amal of Atlit, was administered separately in the 'Iqta of Turabay'. The area's separation from Safed Sanjak was done to reward or pacify the Turabays. Early 16th-century Ottoman tax documents record that fifty-one households of the Banu Haritha were encamped near the Daughters of Jacob Bridge.

The Ottoman beylerbey (provincial governor) of Damascus, Janbirdi al-Ghazali, captured and executed Qaraja in 1519, along with three chiefs from the area of Nablus. The execution was likely connected to an earlier attack by Bedouin tribesmen against a Muslim pilgrim caravan returning to Damascus from the Hajj in Mecca. After the death of Selim in 1520, Janbirdi revolted and declared himself sultan. He was supported by the Bedouin tribes of Banu Ata, Banu Atiyya and Sawalim (all based around Gaza and Ramla), who were aligned against the Turabays. Under the leadership of Qaraja's son Turabay, the family fought alongside the Ottomans against the rebels, who were defeated. Turabay gained the confidence of the Ottomans after the suppression of Janbirdi's revolt. He was entrusted in 1530/31 with overseeing the construction of the Ukhaydir fort in the Hejaz on the Hajj caravan route to Mecca. A further testament to Ottoman confidence in Turabay was the large size of his iltizam (tax farm), the revenues of which amounted to 516,855 akces. His iltizam spanned the subdistricts of Qaqun, Marj Bani Amir, the Ghawr, Banu Kinana, Banu Atika and Banu Juhma, at the time located in the sanjaks of Safed, Ajlun and Damascus. His uncle Budah and son Sab' held timars (fiefs) in the subdistricts of Acre in 1533–1536 and Tiberias in 1533–1539, respectively.

There may have been tensions between Turabay and Sinan Pasha al-Tuwashi, the beylerbey of Damascus in 1545–1548, and the latter's successors. In 1552 the Turabays were accused of rebellion for acquiring illegal firearms and the authorities warned the sanjak-beys (district governors) of Damascus Eyalet to prohibit their subjects' dealings with the family. A nephew of Turabay was sent to Damascus to secure a pardon for the family. The information about this event is unclear, but the Sublime Porte (Ottoman imperial government) requested the beylerbey of Damascus to lure and punish the family; Turabay may have been killed as a consequence.

Early governors of Lajjun

The Iqta of Turabay became its own sanjak, called the Lajjun Sanjak after its center, Lajjun, in 1559. Turabay's son Ali was appointed the new district's sanjak-bey, becoming the first member of the family to hold the office. Under his leadership, the Turabays once again entered into a state of rebellion by acquiring firearms and Ali was replaced by a imperial official, Kemal Bey, in 1564. Three years later the Porte ordered the arrest and imprisonment of a member of the family for stockpiling arms. Ali was succeeded as head of the family by Assaf, who worked to reconcile with the Ottomans by demonstrating his obedience to the Porte. He allied with the sanjak-bey of Gaza, Ridwan Pasha, who lobbied on his behalf to the Porte, writing that Assaf safeguarded the road between Cairo and Damascus. The Porte responded in 1571 that if he continued to be obedient he would be granted the sultan's favor. Two years later he was appointed sanjak-bey of Lajjun.

Assaf was dismissed in 1583 in connection to a Bedouin rebellion. Six years later he was exiled to Rhodes, pardoned, and allowed to return and reside in Lajjun, but was not reinstated as sanjak-bey. During his absence an impostor with the same name, referred to in Ottoman documents as "Assaf the Liar" had gained control of the sanjak. The Ottomans appointed another member of the family, Turabay ibn Ali, as sanjak-bey on 22 November 1589. Assaf the Liar went to Damascus in an attempt to legalize his control of the sanjak. Although the beylerbey of Damascus, Muhammad Pasha ibn Sinan Pasha sought to grant his request, the Porte ordered that he be arrested and executed in October 1590. Two years later the actual Assaf lodged a complaint against Turabay ibn Ali, accusing him of having seized from him 150,000 coins, 300 camels and 2,500 calves. In 1594 Turabay ibn Ali acted as a placeholder for the sanjak-bey of Gaza, Ahmad Pasha ibn Ridwan, continued to govern Lajjun until his death in 1601. According to the historian Abdul-Rahim Abu-Husayn, Turabay demonstrated "a special capability" and the Ottomans had "confidence in his person". By the 17th century the Banu Haritha's dwelling areas were in the coastal plain of Palestine between Qaqun in the northern coastal plain and Kafr Kanna in the Lower Galilee and the surrounding hinterland.

Governorship of Ahmad

Turabay was succeeded as sanjak-bey of Lajjun by his son Ahmad Bey, the "greatest leader" of the dynasty, according to Sharon. Ahmad and his brother Ali Bey had already been joint holders of ziamet (land grants) worth 20,000 akces in the Atlit subdistrict from 1593. Ahmad's rule over Lajjun was soon followed with the appointment of the Druze chieftain Fakhr al-Din Ma'n to the Safed Sanjak. Fakhr al-Din had already been in control of the ports of Sidon and Beirut, and southern Mount Lebanon as the sanjak-bey of Sidon-Beirut; with the appointment to Safed Sanjak, his control was extended to the port of Acre and the Galilee. Abu-Husayn notes that "this had the effect of bringing the two chiefs, as immediate neighbors, into direct confrontation with one another". During the rebellion of Ali Janbulad of Aleppo and Fakhr al-Din against the Ottomans in Syria in 1606, Ahmad generally remained neutral. However, he welcomed the overall commander of the Ottoman forces in the region, Yusuf Sayfa, in Haifa after the rebels ousted him from Tripoli. Janbulad demanded Ahmad execute Yusuf, but he refused, and Yusuf made his way to Damascus. Later, he ignored summons to join the imperial army of Grand Vizier Murad Pasha, who suppressed the rebellion in 1607. Interested in weakening his powerful neighbor to the north, Ahmad joined the government campaign of Hafiz Ahmed Pasha against Fakhr al-Din and his Ma'n dynasty in Mount Lebanon in 1613–1614, which prompted the Druze chief's flight to Europe.

Upon his pardon and return in 1618, Fakhr al-Din pursued an expansionist policy, making conflict between him and the Turabays "inevitable", according to Abu-Husayn. Initially, Ahmad dispatched his son Turabay with a present of Arabian horses to welcome back Fakhr al-Din. When Fakhr al-Din and his kethuda Mustafa were appointed to the sanjaks of Ajlun and Nablus, respectively, in 1622, Ahmad's brother-in-law, a resident of Nablus Sanjak called Shaykh Asi, refused to recognize the new governor. At the same time, Ahmad engaged Mustafa in conflict over the village of Qabatiya and the surrounding farms. Reinforcements sent to Mustafa were defeated by the villagers of Nablus Sanjak. Mustafa and Fakhr al-Din opposed the refuge Ahmad offered to fleeing peasants from the Nablus area and Shia Muslim rural chieftains who fled Safed Sanjak.

When Fakhr al-Din and his proxies were dismissed from the sanjaks of Safed, Ajlun and Nablus in 1623, Ahmad backed their replacements Bashir Qansuh in Ajlun and Muhammad ibn Farrukh in Nablus. Starting in the 16th century, the Turabays had developed a military, economic and marital alliance with the Farrukhs of Nablus and the Ridwans of Gaza. By the following century, the extensive ties between the three ruling families practically made them "one extended family", according to the historian Dror Ze'evi. Fakhr al-Din responded to the Turabays' support for his replacements by dispatching troops to capture the tower of Haifa and burn villages in Mount Carmel, places in Ahmad's jurisdiction, which were hosting Shia refugees from Safed Sanjak. At the head of an army of sekban mercenaries, Fakhr al-Din captured Jenin, which he garrisoned, and proceeded to resend Mustafa to Nablus. The two sides met in battle at the Awja River, where Ahmad and his local allies decisively defeated Fakhr al-Din and forced his retreat. The Porte expressed its gratitude to Ahmad and his allies by enlarging his land holdings.

The Druze chief soon had to contend with a campaign by the beylerbey Mustafa Pasha of Damascus, allowing Ahmad to clear Lajjun Sanjak of the residual Ma'nid presence. To that end his brother Ali recaptured the tower of Haifa, killed the commander of the Ma'nid sekbans there, and raided the plain around Acre. Fakhr al-Din defeated and captured Mustafa Pasha in the Battle of Anjar later that year and extracted from the beylerbey the appointment of his son Mansur as sanjak-bey of Lajjun. Nonetheless, the Ma'nids could not gain control there, even after recapturing the tower of Haifa in May/June 1624. Ahmad sued for peace with Fakhr al-Din, but the latter offered him deputy control of the sanjak and conditioned it on Ahmad's submission to Fakhr al-Din in person; Ahmad ignored the offer. Later that month Ahmad and his ally Muhammad ibn Farrukh defeated Fakhr al-Din in battle and shortly after dislodged the Ma'nid sekbans stationed in Jenin. At the end of June, Ahmad took up residence in the town. He then sent his Bedouin troops to raid the plain of Acre.

Afterward, Ahmad and Fakhr al-Din reached an agreement stipulating the withdrawal of Ma'nid troops from the tower of Haifa, an end to Bedouin raids against Safed Sanjak, and the establishment of peaceful relations; afterward "communication between bilad [the lands of Banu] Haritha and bilad Safad was resumed", according to the contemporary local historian al-Khalidi al-Safadi. Ahmad had the tower of Haifa demolished to avoid a future a Ma'nid takeover. According to Sharon, the Turabays' victories against the Ma'n "compelled" Fakhr al-Din "to abandon his plans for subjecting northern Palestine", while Bakhit stated that Fakhr al-Din's retreat from Turabay territory to confront the Damascenes and their local allies at Anjar "rescued him from probable destruction at the hands of Ahmad Turabay". The Ottomans launched a campaign against Fakhr al-Din in 1633, during which he was captured. One of his nephews who survived the campaign, Mulhim, was given refuge by Ahmad. Upon learning of Fakhr al-Din's capture and the death of Mulhim's father Yunus, Ahmad arranged for one of his kethudas to surrender Mulhim to the authorities in Damascus, but Mulhim escaped.

Ahmad was dismissed as sanjak-bey in May 1640 for his role in a rebellion, but reappointed in the same year. He remained in office until his death in 1647. At different times during his governorship, his brothers Ali, Azzam and Muhammad and son Zayn Bey held iltizam, timars, and ziamets of the sanjak in general or its subdistricts of Atlit, Shara and Shafa.

Later chiefs and downfall

Ahmad's son Zayn succeeded him as sanjak-bey and held the office until his death in 1660. Zayn was described by near-contemporary local and foreign sources as "courageous, wise and modest". His brother and successor Muhammad Bey was described by the French merchant and diplomat Laurent d'Arvieux as a dreamy chief heavily addicted to hashish. The fortunes of the family began to deteriorate under his chieftainship, though he continued to successfully perform his duties as sanjak-bey, protecting the roads and helping suppress a peasants' revolt in Nablus Sanjak. D'Arvieux was dispatched by the French consul of Sidon in August 1664 to request from Muhammad the reestablishment of monks from the Carmelite Order in Mount Carmel. Muhammad befriended d'Arvieux, who afterward served as his secretary for Arabic and Turkish correspondences while Muhammad's usual secretary was ill. Muhammad died on 1 October 1671 and was buried in Jenin.

Throughout the late 17th century the Porte, having eliminated the power of Fakhr al-Din, who "had reduced Ottoman authority in Syria to a mere shadow" in the words of Abu-Husayn, embarked on a centralization drive in the western districts of Damascus Eyalet to suppress the power of local chiefs. In Palestine the Turabays, Ridwans and Farrukhs considered the region's sanjaks to be their own and resisted imperial attempts to weaken their control, while being careful not to openly rebel against the Porte. The Porte became increasingly concerned with the local dynasties in the late 17th century due to decreasing tax revenues from their sanjaks and the loss of control of the Hajj caravan routes. High-ranking officers, governors of districts outside of Syria, and family members of the imperial elite were gradually appointed to the sanjaks of Damascus. Implementation of the policy proved challenging in the case of the Turabays in Lajjun; their chiefs were occasionally dismissed but would shortly after regain office. With the imprisonment and execution of the Ridwan governor Husayn Pasha in 1662/63, and the mysterious death of the sanjak-bey Assaf Farrukh on his way to Constantinople in 1670/71, the alliance of the three dynasties was fatally weakened.

The Turabays' position declined further with Muhammad's death. His nephews succeeded him as sanjak-bey for relatively short stints: Salih Bey, the son of Zayn, ruled until he was succeeded by his cousin Yusuf Bey, the son of Ali. Yusuf was dismissed from the post in 1677 and replaced by an Ottoman officer, Ahmed Pasha al-Tarazi, who was also appointed to other sanjaks in Palestine; "the [Ottoman] government had abandoned them", in the contemporary historian al-Muhibbi's words. The Turabays' governorship of Lajjun thus ended and the family "ceased to be a ruling power" in the words of Bakhit. Sharon attributes the decline of the Turabays to the eastward migration of the Banu Haritha to the Jordan Valley and the Ajlun region in the late 17th century. In the last years of the 17th century, the Turabays were politically replaced in northern Palestine by the semi-Bedouin Banu Zaydan of Zahir al-Umar.

Although they were dispossessed of their government, the Turabays remained in the sanjak. The emirs of the dynasty were visited in Jenin by the Sufi traveler Abd al-Ghani al-Nabulsi (d. 1731), who wrote that "They are now in eclipse". Sharon notes that "the memory of the Turabays was completely erased with their fall". Descendants of the family lived in Tulkarm and were known as the Tarabih. The Tarabih were part of the Fuqaha clan, which was a collective of several families genealogically unrelated to each other. The Fuqaha were the religious scholarly elite of Tulkarm in the 17th–19th centuries.

Governance and way of life

In their capacity as multazims the Turabays were responsible for collecting taxes in their jurisdiction on behalf of the Porte. They designated a sheikh (chief) in each village in the sanjak to collect the taxes from the peasants. The village sheikhs paid the Turabay emirs based on the harvest. In return, the lives and properties of the village chiefs were defended by the Turabays. In the words of Sharon, the Turabays "developed good and effective relations with the sedentary population". The annual revenues forwarded to the emir in the late 17th century amounted to about 100,000 piasters, a relatively small amount. The Turabays levied customs on the European ships which occasionally docked in the harbors of Haifa and Tantura. Both ports were also used by the Turabays for their own imports, including coffee, vegetables, rice and cloth. The revenues derived from Haifa ranged from 1,000 akces in 1538 to 10,000 akces in 1596, while the combined revenues of Tantura, Tirat Luza (near Mount Carmel) and Atlit were 5,000 akces in 1538. The family's emirs may have served as the qadis (head judges) of the sanjak, at least in the case of Muhammad Turabay. D'Arvieux noted that Muhammad rarely ordered death sentences.

The Turabays were responsible for ensuring the safety of the sanjak's roads for traveling merchants and the imperial post, and suppressing local rebellions. Their success in guarding the roads was frequently acknowledged in Ottoman government documents where their chiefs are referred to by their Mamluk-era title amir al-darbayn. The Turabay emirs ignored their official duty as sanjak-beys to participate in imperial wars upon demand, but they generally remained loyal to the Ottomans in Syria, including during the peak of Fakhr al-Din's power. The Turabays' army was composed of their tribesmen, whose solidarity stood in contrast to the sekbans of Fakhr al-Din who fought for pay; the Turabays' battlefield successes against the latter were likely owed to their tribal power base. At the time of d'Arvieux's visit, Muhammad Turabay could field an army of 4,000–5,000 Bedouin warriors. The Sunni Muslim faith of the Turabays also helped secure the favor of the Sunni Muslim Ottoman state.

The Turabays retained their Bedouin way of life, living in tents among their Banu Haritha tribesmen. In the summers they encamped along the Na'aman River near Acre and in the winters they encamped near Caesarea. D'Arvieux noted that their chiefs could have resided in palaces, but chose not to; they remained nomadic out of pride. Although they retained their nomadic tents, by the 17th century they also established residences in the towns of Lajjun and Jenin. The family, and the Banu Haritha in general, were mainly dependent on livestock for their source of living. Their main assets were their horses, camels, cattle, goats, sheep and grain. According to Sharon, "they introduced two innovations as a mark of their official status": the employment of a secretary to handle their correspondences and the use of a band composed of tambourines, oboes, drums and trumpets. Assaf built a mosque in Tirat Luza in 1579/80, which contained an inscription bearing his name ("Emir Assaf ibn Nimr Bey"). The family designated Jenin as the administrative headquarters of the sanjak and buried their dead in the town's Izz al-Din cemetery. Turabay ibn Ali was the first emir of the family to be buried in a mausoleum, later known as Qubbat al-Amir Turabay (Dome of Amir Turabay). The building was the only grave of the Turabays to have survived into the 20th century and no longer exists today. It consisted of a domed chamber housing the tombstone of the emir with a two-line inscription reading: Basmalah [in the name of God]. This is the tomb of the slave who is in need of his Lord, the Exalted, al-Amir Turabay b. Ali. The year 1010 [AH, i.e. 1601 CE].

The Turabay emirs oversaw nearly a century of relative peace and stability in northern Palestine. According to Abu-Husayn, they maintained the favor of the Ottomans by "properly attending to the administrative and guard duties assigned to them" and served as an "example of a dynasty of bedouin chiefs who managed to perpetuate their control over a given region". They stood in contrast to their Bedouin contemporaries, the Furaykhs of the Beqaa Valley, who used initial imperial favor to enrich themselves at the expense of the proper governance of their territory. As a result of their administrative success, military strength, and loyalty to the Porte, the Turabays were one of the few local dynasties to maintain their rule throughout the 16th and 17th centuries.

Notes

References

Bibliography

 

Ottoman Palestine
Jenin
Arabs from the Ottoman Empire
17th-century Arabs
16th-century Arabs
15th-century Arabs
Arabs from the Mamluk Sultanate
Political people from the Ottoman Empire
Arab dynasties
Sunni dynasties